Title 45 of the United States Code outlines the role of rail transport in the United States Code.

Chapters 
 : Safety Appliances and Equipment on Railroad Engines and Cars, and Protection of Employees and Travelers
 : Liability for Injuries to Employees
 : Hours of Service of Employees
 : Care of Animals in Transit
 : Government-Aided Railroads
 : Mediation, Conciliation, and Arbitration in Controversies Between Carriers and Employees
 : Adjustment Boards and Labor Boards
 : Railway Labor
 : Retirement of Railroad Employees
 : Tax on Carriers and Employees
 : Railroad Unemployment Insurance
 : Temporary Railroad Unemployment Insurance Program
 : Railroad Safety
 : Rail Passenger Service
 : Emergency Rail Services
 : Regional Rail Reorganization
 : Railroad Revitalization and Regulatory Reform
 : Milwaukee Railroad Restructuring
 : Rock Island Railroad Employee Assistance
 : Northeast Rail Service
 : Alaska Railroad Transfer
 : Conrail Privatization

External links
U.S. Code Title 45, via United States Government Printing Office
U.S. Code Title 45, via Cornell University

45
Title 45